Manju Jaidka is Head of Department at Shoolini University's department of English. She was formerly a professor at Panjab University, Chandigarh, India.

Books
 Narratives Across Borders. Cambridge Scholars, 2016. http://www.cambridgescholars.com/narratives-across-borders 
 Deepa Mehta's Elemental Trilogy. New Delhi: Readworthy Press, July 2011. https://books.google.com/books/about/A_Critical_Study_of_Deepa_Mehta_s_Trilog.html?id=n_x1dnrUwmsC&redir_esc=y 
 Landmarks in American Literature. New Delhi:Prestige Press, 2007. http://www.easternbookcorporation.com/moreinfo.php?txt_searchstring=13708
 Politics of Location in the Multi-Ethnic Literatures of the Americas, co-edited with Anil Raina (Chandigarh: Arun Publishing House, 2003).
 An Annotated Anthology of English and American Poetry (University Grants Commission Text Book Award). Chandigarh: Panjab University Publication Bureau, 2002.
 Cross-Cultural Transactions in Multi-Ethnic Literatures of America, eds. Anil Raina, Manju Jaidka, Somdatta Mandal and Vijay Kumar Sharma.  New Delhi:Prestige Press, 2002
 From Slant to Straight: Recent Trends in Women's Poetry.  New Delhi: Prestige Publishers, 2000.
 T. S. Eliot's Use of Popular Sources (Mellen Press, US, 1997). This was her Post-Doctoral Fulbright project for which research was carried out at the Houghton (Harvard University, Cambridge, MA), Beinecke (Yale), Harry Ramson Centre (Austin, Texas), and New York Public Library.
 Tiresias and Other Masks: English and American Poetry after The Waste Land.  Chandigarh: Arun Publishing House, 1994.
 Confession and Beyond: The Poetry of Sylvia Plath. Chandigarh: Arun Publishing House, 1992.

Awards and honours

Recent:
  2016: Award for Lifetime Contribution to Literature from Chandigarh Sahitya Akademi.
  2015 (March): Visiting Professorship, New York University.
  April 2010 and April 2012: Visiting Professor, University of Illinois at Champaign-Urbana. 
  March – April 2008, Jaidka was awarded the Lillian Robinson Fellowship by the Simone de Beauvoir Institute for Feminist Studies, Concordia University, Montreal, Canada. http://wsdb.concordia.ca/faculty-and-staff/lillian-robinson-scholars/documents/PreviousLillianRobinsonScholars_002.pdf

References 

Indian women historians
1953 births
Living people
Women writers from Punjab, India
Rockefeller Foundation people
People from Karnal district
Indian literary historians
Scientists from Chandigarh
20th-century Indian historians
Women scientists from Chandigarh
20th-century Indian women writers
20th-century Indian writers
20th-century Indian women scientists
20th-century Indian scientists
Scholars from Chandigarh
Women literary historians